Irina Lyakhovskaya (2 March 1941 – 2003) was a Russian freestyle swimmer. She competed in the women's 4 × 100 metre freestyle relay at the 1960 Summer Olympics for the Soviet Union.

References

External links
 

1941 births
2003 deaths
Russian female freestyle swimmers
Olympic swimmers of the Soviet Union
Swimmers at the 1960 Summer Olympics
Swimmers from Saint Petersburg
Soviet female freestyle swimmers